Swathi Sangeetha Puraskaram is the highest honour for musicians instituted by the Kerala State Government. It's named after Swathi Thirunal Rama Varma, the Maharaja of Travancore (തിരുവിതാംകൂര്‍), in India.The award carries a cash prize of rupees one lakh, citation and a medal

Complete List of Recipients

References

Kerala awards
Culture of Kerala
Indian music awards
Awards established in 1997
1997 establishments in Kerala